Tony Castro (full name Antonio Maria de Lancastre de Mello e Castro), Conde das Antas, Conde da Lousa, Visconde de Pernes, born 1952, is a yacht designer, known for numerous winning designs. Born in Lisbon, Portugal, he has been designing sailing and motor yachts since about 1980, with more than 10,000 boats launched, ranging from custom boats and one-design production models to superyachts. His design firm is based in Hamble-le-Rice, England.

Career
As a Chartered Engineer, his first job came about when it was discovered that Denis Doyle's yacht Moonduster was floating above her 'marks', having been built less heavily than had been intended her designer, Germán Frers. Castro advised that lead be attached to the underside of the coachroof and had a hole drilled in the keel to reduce her stability, which gave the vessel an exceptionally good handicap for a boat of her size. Moonduster held the Round Ireland monohull record from Wicklow to Wicklow for nearly 15 years until the record was broken by a Whitbread around the World yacht. Her fastest elapsed time for the race came in 1984, when she took only 88h, 15m and 43s to complete the course.

After leaving Ron Holland’s design team in 1980, Castro's first significant racing yacht design was Justine III, for Frank Woods of the National Yacht Club in Ireland. She was the first and only yacht to win the One Ton Cup with five straight first place victories. The same owner then built Justine IV, which was crowned best Offshore Admiral's Cupper in 1983.

Then followed Iztanother Purla, a 43 footer which missed being chosen for the British Admiral's Cup Team, but then went on to win all 7 races in Cowes Week, beating all the Admiral's Cuppers, helmed by the late Sir Peter Blake and his NZ crew from Steinlager. A boat full of innovative ideas, including praddle steering, a method of steering using a vertical arm rising from below the cockpit floor.  

Later successes included the two-time Quarter-Ton Cup winner McDonald's, the Half Ton Cup winner Balthazar, and the 6mR World Championship and Coupe de France winner Thisbe.

He was appointed by a member of Royal Cork Yacht Club to redesign the J24, with the aim of producing an exciting sports boat. The client expected a bigger mainsail, a new deck moulding and an effective keel to give greater stability. The result was the 1720 sportsboat. A new era in Sportsboat racing had started: The boats were built in Co. Kerry, and about 100 were built starting with sail number 1720, and although successful, it was considered that the 1720 had shortcomings, namely too powerful a rig, which meant that the boat required too many crew. The SB20, elected Boat of the Year Overall 2008, addressed all of these shortcomings and is now to be seen worldwide.

Castro's designers work with many boatyards internationally, including the Royal Huisman, Jongert, Palmer Johnson, Neptunus, CS Yachts, Laser, and Jeanneau, Beneteau, Galeon, Focus, Williams, etc.

Achievements

Major achievements
His designs have won Yacht of the Year awards, a Superyacht Design award and several World championships. He has also designed yachts for use in television drama productions by the BBC.

 4 International Offshore Racing (IOR) World Championships
 Designer of the only IOR boat ever to win all its races in a World Championship
 International 6m World Champion
 Designer of 4 "Boat of Year" awards in the UK, France and US
 Admirals Cup Winner 1989 with "Juno IV"
 Co-Designer for "BLUE ARROW", a British America's Cup challenger

Designs
Castro's boat designs are:

Arcadia 30 (Jeanneau)
Barracuda 45
Clipper 70
CORK 1720
CS 30
CS 34
CS 36 Merlin
CS 40
CS 44
Jaguar 24
Jaguar 265
Laser SB3
MG 26 (Castro)
MG 335
MG Spring 25
Parker 31
Parker 325
Regatta 39 (Jeanneau)
Saga 409
SB3
Sun Dream 28 (Jeanneau)
Sun Fast 1/2 Ton (Jeanneau)
Sun Odyssey 28.1 (Jeanneau)
Sun Shine 36 (Jeanneau)
Sun Shine 38 (Jeanneau)
Sun Way 28 (Jeanneau)
Sun Way 28 CB (Jeanneau)

Other achievements by date

Memberships
 Member of the Royal Institution of Naval Architects ( UK - RINA)
 Member of the Society of Naval Architects ( USA - SNAME)
 Member of FEANI
 Member of the Royal Cork Yacht Club
 Member of the Royal Ocean Racing Club
 Member of the Royal Southern Yacht Club
 Member of the Associacao Naval de Lisboa
 Member of the Clube Naval de Cascais

References

Yachts designed by Tony Castro

America's Cup yacht designers
British yacht designers
Living people
Year of birth missing (living people)
Place of birth missing (living people)